Thomas Soladay (born August 20, 1983) is an American former professional racing cyclist, who competed professionally between 2009 and 2017 for the ,  and  teams. He currently works as the communications director for the  team.

He rode in the men's team time trial at the 2015 UCI Road World Championships in Richmond, Virginia.

Major results

2008
 9th US Air Force Cycling Classic
2011
 International Cycling Classic
1st Stages 9 & 16
2013
 6th Tour de Delta
2014
 7th Bucks County Classic
2016
 5th White Spot / Delta Road Race

References

External links

1983 births
Living people
American male cyclists
People from Bethesda, Maryland
Sportspeople from Maryland